Aleksandr Ovsyankin (18 October 1924 – 2006) was a Soviet fencer. He competed in the team foil event at the 1956 Summer Olympics.

References

External links
 

1924 births
2006 deaths
Russian male fencers
Soviet male fencers
Olympic fencers of the Soviet Union
Fencers at the 1956 Summer Olympics
People from Murom
Sportspeople from Vladimir Oblast